Vasai Assembly constituency  is one of the 288 Vidhan Sabha (Legislative Assembly) constituencies of Maharashtra state in western India.

Overview
Vasai constituency is one of the six Vidhan Sabha constituencies located in the Palghar district. It is a non-reserved assembly constituency and part of Vasai taluka of the district.

Vasai is part of the Palghar Lok Sabha constituency along with five other Vidhan Sabha segments, namely Dahanu,  Vikramgad, Palghar, Boisar and Nalasopara in the Palghar district.

Before delimitation, Vasai Assembly constituency was part of the Mumbai North (Lok Sabha constituency).

Members of Legislative Assembly

Election results

2019 results

2014 results

2009 results

See also
 Vasai
 List of constituencies of Maharashtra Vidhan Sabha

Assembly constituencies of Palghar district
Vasai-Virar
Assembly constituencies of Maharashtra